Stefan Blunschi (born 10 August 1983) is a Swiss former professional footballer who played for FC Lucerne, FC Baden, FC Wil, FC Aarau and SC Cham.

Blunschi began playing football with FC Luzern's youth side, and he initially showed promise before moving on to other clubs. He won the 2003–04 Swiss Cup with FC Wil, shortly before the club was relegated at the end of the season. Just weeks after signing a two-year contract with Aarau, Blunschi suffered a back injury which ended his professional football career.

References

1983 births
Living people
Swiss men's footballers
FC Luzern players
FC Baden players
FC Wil players
SC Cham players
Association football midfielders